The 2022 Fanatec GT World Challenge Asia Powered by AWS is the fourth season of SRO Motorsports Group and Team Asia One GT Management's GT World Challenge Asia, an auto racing series for grand tourer cars in Asia. The races are contested with GT3-spec and GT4-spec cars. The season was began on 20 May at Sepang in Malaysia and was scheduled to end on 23 October at the new Mandalika Circuit in Indonesia, however the round was cancelled due to homologation issues, therefore the championship finished at the Okayama International Circuit in Japan. It is the second season of the unification of GT3 sprint series across the globe under the World Challenge name and the first since Blancpain ended its title sponsorship of the series.

Calendar

 The Pirelli Indonesian GT Series originally scheduled 21–23 October, but was cancelled due to track homologation issues.

Entry list

Race results

Championship standings
Scoring system
Championship points are awarded for the first ten positions in each race. Entries are required to complete 75% of the winning car's race distance in order to be classified and earn points. Individual drivers are required to participate for a minimum of 25 minutes in order to earn championship points in any race.

Drivers' championships

Overall

Notes:

 † – Drivers did not finish the race, but were classified as they completed more than 90% of the race distance.

Silver Cup

Pro-Am Cup

Silver-Am Cup

Am Cup 

Notes:
 † – Drivers did not finish the race, but were classified as they completed more than 90% of the race distance.

Teams' championship
Only the two best results of a team per race counted towards the Teams' championship.

See also 

 2022 British GT Championship
 2022 GT World Challenge Europe
 2022 GT World Challenge Europe Endurance Cup
 2022 GT World Challenge Europe Sprint Cup
 2022 GT World Challenge America
 2022 GT World Challenge Australia
 2022 Intercontinental GT Challenge

Notes 
Despite entering into the Am Cup and Japan Cup, Motohiro Ogura and Akihiro Tsuzuki did not receive Am Cup or Japan Cup points as they did finish in the overall GT3 points.

References

External links

GT World Challenge Asia
GT World Challenge Asia